Michael Olczyk (born 8 March 1997) is a Polish footballer playing for Berliner AK 07. He was born and raised in Germany and also holds German citizenship.

References

1997 births
People from Dorsten
Sportspeople from Münster (region)
German people of Polish descent
Poland youth international footballers
Living people
Polish footballers
Association football defenders
FC Schalke 04 II players
Olimpia Grudziądz players
Arka Gdynia players
Berliner AK 07 players
Regionalliga players
Ekstraklasa players
I liga players